SS Columbia was a large screw-driven tugboat that operated on the Arrow Lakes and Columbia River in British Columbia, Canada.

History 
She was built in 1896 at Nakusp, British Columbia for the increased freight traffic between Nakusp and Arrowhead due to the completion of the Nakusp and Slocan Railway. She was the only screw-driven tug built for the Columbia & Kootenay Steam Navigation Company, but many others were later built once the Canadian Pacific Railway company took ownership. Columbia was an important unit of the fleet because she was powerful and better suited to handling large railway transfer barges and freight barges than sternwheelers were. She was scrapped in 1920 and her machinery went to her replacement, a tug also called Columbia, built in 1920.

References 

1896 ships
Ships built in British Columbia
Steamboats of the Arrow Lakes
Canadian Pacific Railway
Steamships of Canada